The Czech Republic national futsal team  is the national futsal team of the Czech Republic and represents the country in international futsal competitions, such as the FIFA Futsal World Cup and the European Championships. The team is controlled by the Football Association of the Czech Republic, which is affiliated with UEFA.

Results and fixtures

The following is a list of match results in the last 12 months, as well as any future matches that have been scheduled.
Legend

2021

Team

Current squad
The following players were named for UEFA Futsal Euro 2014.

Competitive record

FIFA Futsal World Cup

UEFA Futsal Championship

FIFUSA/AMF Futsal World Cup

Grand Prix de Futsal

Futsal Confederations Cup

Futsal Mundialito

References

External links
www.fotbal.cz

 
European national futsal teams
National